Shannon Lee Dawdy is an American anthropologist, historian, and archaeologist. She is a professor at the University of Chicago and a MacArthur Fellow.

Education
Dawdy holds a PhD in anthropology and history and an MA in history from the University of Michigan, an MA in anthropology from the College of William and Mary and a BA in anthropology from Reed College.

Research
Dawdy is 'Professor of Anthropology and of Social Sciences in the College' at the University of Chicago. Her research focuses on the Americas, with a special focus on New Orleans, from the colonial period to the post-Katrina present. Her research has focused on the history of capitalism and informal economies (including piracy) urban landscapes, human-object relations, and temporality (how people shape and experience the past, present, and future). Her newest work examines rapidly changing death practices in the U.S., resulting in both a film (I Like Dirt. with co-director Daniel Zox) and a book, American Afterlives: Reinventing Death in the Twenty-first Century (October 2021, Princeton). She writes for both academic and general audiences.

In 2010, Dawdy was named a MacArthur Fellow. She has also received support from the National Endowment for the Humanities and the National Science Foundation.

Bibliography

References

American archaeologists
American anthropologists
Living people
University of Chicago faculty
MacArthur Fellows
University of Michigan College of Literature, Science, and the Arts alumni
Reed College alumni
1967 births
American women archaeologists
American women academics
21st-century American women